A rhoptry is a specialized secretory organelle. They are club-shaped organelles connected by thin necks to the extreme apical pole of the parasite. These organelles, like micronemes, are characteristic of the motile stages of Apicomplexa protozoans. They can vary in number and shape and contain numerous enzymes that are released during the penetration process. The proteins they contain are important in the interaction between the host and the parasite, including the formation of the parasitophorous vacuole.

References

Organelles